10th OTO Awards

SND, Bratislava, Slovakia

Overall winner  Adela Banášová

Hall of Fame  Štefan Kvietik

Život Award  Martin Mózer

◄ 9th | 11th ►

The 10th OTO Awards, honoring the best in Slovak popular culture for the year 2009, took time and place on March 13, 2010 at the former Opera building of the Slovak National Theater in Bratislava. The ceremony broadcast live STV. The hosts of the show were Michal Hudák and Štefan Skrúcaný.

Presenters

 Adela Banášová and Tomáš Maštalír
 Peter Batthyany and Peter Sklár
 Peter Batthyany and Matej "Sajfa" Cifra
 Andrej Bičan and Daniel Dangl
 Zuzana Fialová and Janko Kroner
 Jarmila Lajčáková (née Hargašová) and Štefan Nižňanský
 Monika Hilmerová and Daniel Krajcer
 Renáta Klačanská
 Jana Kocianová, Marcela Laiferová and Eva Máziková
 Boris Kollár and Jana Prágerová
 Maroš Kramár and Diana Mórová, actors
 Lukáš Latinák and Petra Polnišová
 Juraj Lelkes and Miroslav Žbirka
 Svätopluk Malachovský and René Štúr 
 Juraj Mokrý
 Soňa Müllerová
 Zdena Studenková and Jozef Vajda

Performers
 Nina Balaščáková, child singer
 Michal Hudák, Juraj Mokrý and Štefan Skrúcaný
 Jana Kocianová, Marcela Laiferová and Eva Máziková, singers
 Zuzana Mauréry, Nikol McCloud, Sisa Sklovská and Anita Soul, singers

Winners and nominees

Main categories
 Television

 Music

Others

Superlatives

Multiple nominees
 2 nominations
 Zlatica Švajdová (née Puškárová)

Reception

TV ratings
The show has gained on Jednotka a 37.1% ratings share among adults over 12 and, parallelly, 2.2% on the STV sister's channel Trojka.  It garnered 734,000 and 44,000 viewers, making it a total audience of 778,000 viewers (39.3% share) on both RTVS networks and the most watched prime time TV program of the night in the region. Among adults aged 12–54, the totals were less; 32% with 394,000 viewers.

References

External links
 Archive > OTO 2009 – 10th edition  (Official website)
 OTO 2009 – 10th edition (Official website - old)
 Winners and nominees - Top 3 list (at Trend)
 Winners and nominees - Top 7 list  (at Život)

OTO Awards
2009 in Slovak music
2009 in Slovak television
2009 television awards